This is a list of free daily newspapers published around the world, organized by country.

Austria
Österreich

Belgium
 Metro (separate Dutch and French versions)

Brazil
 Destak

Canada
 24 Hours in Montreal
 Métro in Montreal

Chile
 Publimetro

Colombia
 Publimetro

Croatia
 24sata

Denmark

Copenhagen
 MetroXpress

France
 20 Minutes
 Direct Matin
 Metronews

Hong Kong

Chinese
 am730
 Headline Daily
 Lion Rock Daily
 Metropolis Daily
 Sky Post

English
 The Standard

Israel
 Israel Hayom
 Israel Post

Italy
 Leggo
 Metro

Malaysia
 theSun

Netherlands
 Metro

Philippines
 Inquirer Libre

Portugal
 Destak

Russia
The Moscow Times

Serbia
 24 sata

Spain
 20 minutos (whole Spain) - circulation > 1,500,000 units

Sweden
 Nyheter24
 SVT Nyheter
 SR Nyheter

Switzerland

French
 20 minutes

German
 20 Minuten
 Baslerstab
 Blick am Abend

Italian
 20 Minuti

United Kingdom
 The Metro - in several commuter areas including London, Manchester, and West Yorkshire

London

 City A.M.
 The Evening Standard - from October 2009

United States
Most of the papers listed are no longer published daily (as noted); they have either ceased publication or switched to a weekly/semi-weekly schedule.

California
 Palo Alto Daily News - Palo Alto; while its website is continuously updated, the physical paper was cut back to a weekly in 2015
 Palo Alto Daily Post - Palo Alto; successor to the Daily News
 San Francisco Examiner - San Francisco  As of March, 2020, this paper is only published three times a week—on Sunday, Wednesday and Thursday.

Colorado
 Aspen Times - Aspen
 Colorado Daily - Boulder   As of February 2020, this paper has become a weekly, published Fridays only.

District of Columbia
 Washington Examiner - Washington, D.C.; the print edition ended in 2013, although a website continues to provide current news
 Washington Express - Washington, D.C.; On September 12, 2019, Express published its last edition.
The Epoch Times - Washington DC; The paper, while also offering paid subscriptions, continued to offer papers free at boxes around the city, until August 15, 2019.

Florida

Illinois
 RedEye - Chicago  Paper became a weekly in 2017.

Massachusetts
 Boston Metro - Boston, closed in January 2020.

Michigan
 The Michigan Daily - Ann Arbor

Nevada
 WJ Las Vegas Daily News - Las Vegas

New Hampshire
 The Berlin Daily Sun - Berlin
 The Conway Daily Sun - North Conway
 The Laconia Daily Sun - Laconia

New York
 AM New York Metro - New York City

Ohio
The Blade - Toledo

Pennsylvania
 Philadelphia Metro - Philadelphia

Puerto Rico
 El Vocero - became free in 2012
 Primera Hora - began 2017

South Carolina
 Bluffton Today - formerly free

Virginia
 Suffolk News-Herald - Suffolk

References

Free